is a Buddhist temple located in the city of Isumi in Chiba Prefecture, Japan. According to an alternate reading of the name in Japanese, the temple is also referred to as Seisui-ji, and is commonly known as the Kiyomizu Kannon. Kiyomizu-dera is the 32nd temple in the Bandō Sanjūsankasho, or the circuit of 33 Buddhist temples in Eastern Japan sacred to bodhisattva Kannon.

According to legend, Kiyomizu-dera was founded in the Heian period by Sakanoue no Tamuramaro, the first shōgun.  Sakanoue no Tamuramaro, closely associated with the construction of Kiyomizu-dera in Kyoto, reputedly built the Isumi temple as a replica of the well-known Kyoto temple of the same name. Nearly all temple structures of the Heian period were destroyed by fire at some time in the Muromachi period between 1469-148, and today few Heian period remnants are extant. The present hon-dō (Main Hall) was reconstructed between 1688 and 1703.

Structures 
Hon-dō
Bell tower
Okuin-dō
Shi Tennō-mon
Niōmon

Order in Buddhist Pilgrimages 
 Bandō Sanjūsankasho
31 Kasamori-ji　--　32 Kiyomizu-dera (Isumi, Chiba) 　--　33 Nago-dera

Sources

External links 
  Otowasan Kiyomizu-dera 

Religious organizations established in the 9th century
Buddhist temples in Chiba Prefecture
Tendai temples